In mathematics, the Chowla–Mordell theorem is a result in number theory determining cases where a Gauss sum is the square root of a prime number, multiplied by a root of unity. It was proved and published independently by Sarvadaman Chowla and Louis Mordell, around 1951.

In detail, if  is a prime number,  a nontrivial Dirichlet character modulo , and 

where  is a primitive -th root of unity in the complex numbers, then

is a root of unity if and only if  is the quadratic residue symbol modulo . The 'if' part was known to Gauss: the contribution of Chowla and Mordell was the 'only if' direction. The ratio in the theorem occurs in the functional equation of L-functions.

References
 Gauss and Jacobi Sums by Bruce C. Berndt, Ronald J. Evans and Kenneth S. Williams, Wiley-Interscience, p. 53.

Cyclotomic fields
Zeta and L-functions
Theorems in number theory

fi:Chowlan–Mordellin lause